Kraina Mriy is the debut studio album by Vopli Vidopliassova. It was originally released in 1994 on BSA Records. When Vopli Vidopliassova's "French period" (1990-1996) ended, the band returned to Ukraine and had the album remixed and re-released in 1997.

Track lists

1997 remix 
The track list was reordered. "Znovu zima" and "Mussa" were replaced with a French version of "Tantsi" entitled "Dansez". The "Dobryy den..." intro was moved from "Karmen" to "Shalena zirka" and the "Ty byla..." text was moved from the end of "Ty ushel" to the beginning. Also, the version of "Ty ushel" on this is an extended version, because the song is sung in French as well as Russian, and the "Ty byla" text is a different recorded version. The news audio was removed from "Tantsi". Also, in "Kraina mriy", the song, after the short intro text, starts to build up straight away instead of fading in. The cowbell was removed from "Kolys".

When this was re-released on Kraina Mriy records in 2006, it had Znovu zima as a bonus track, however it was the original 1994 mix remastered.

When this was released on vinyl in 2013, "Znovu zima" was included at the end of side A.

The track "Legenda o lyubvi" is performed in a vocalise style in both versions of the album, but the lyrics are printed in the booklet. The lyrics were sung live in 1990 at a concert in Sverdlovsk.

The "Zbirka" series of compilations released by VV in 2007 have a near-complete version (excluding "Legenda o lyubvi") of Kraina Mriy split across the four CDs.

Personnel 
 Oleg Skripka - vocals, guitar, accordion
 Yuri Zdorenko - vocals, guitar
 Alexander Pipa - vocals, bass
 Sergei Sakhno - vocals, drums

Cover-versions

In 2011 the band re-sung the song “Країна мрій” (The Land of Dreams) in the Belarusian language as “Краіна мрой” for the Budzma! Tuzin. Perazagruzka-2 compilation album. In 2018 the music portal Tuzin.fm together with Letapis.by selected this self-cover by Vopli Vidopliassova in the top of “60 today’s hits in the Belarusian language,” a list of best songs released since 1988.

References

External links 
 Original release of Kraina Mriy at Discogs
 1997 remix of Kraina Mriy at Discogs (list of versions)

1994 debut albums
Vopli Vidopliassova albums